Lieutenant-General Sir Richard Alan Fyffe KBE CB DSO MC (12 August 1912 – 24 December 1972) was Deputy Chief of Defence Staff (Intelligence).

Military career
Fyffe was commissioned into the Rifle Brigade (The Prince Consort's Own) in 1932.

He served in World War II initially as a General Staff Officer and then with his Regiment in North Africa and Italy. He earned his Military Cross in North Africa in 1943.

After the War he joined the Directing Staff at the Staff College, Camberley before moving to General Headquarters, Far East Land Forces in 1947. He was appointed Assistant Adjutant General at the War Office in 1950 and then Commanding Officer of 1st Bn Rifle Brigade in 1953. He was made Commander of 61st Lorried Infantry Brigade in 1955 and Commander of 11th Infantry Brigade in 1956.

He was appointed Deputy Military Secretary at the War Office in 1957 and Brigadier commanding the Army Air Corps in 1960. He moved on to be Director of Public Relations at the War Office in 1961 and General Officer Commanding 54th (East Anglian) Division/District of the Territorial Army (TA) in July 1963. He was made Head of the British Army Staff at Washington D. C. in 1965.

He was appointed Director of Service Intelligence in 1967 and Deputy Chief of Defence Staff (Intelligence) at the Ministry of Defence in 1968; he retired in 1971.

References

 

|-

1912 births
1972 deaths
Military personnel from Liverpool
British Army Air Corps officers
Rifle Brigade officers
Knights Commander of the Order of the British Empire
Companions of the Order of the Bath
Companions of the Distinguished Service Order
Recipients of the Military Cross
British Army lieutenant generals
Burials in Buckinghamshire
British Army personnel of World War II
Academics of the Staff College, Camberley